Heyburn Lake is a reservoir on Polecat Creek in Creek County, Oklahoma. Tiger and Brown Creeks also drain into the lake. The nearest town is Kellyville, Oklahoma. It was named for the now-defunct community of Heyburn. Its primary objectives are to provide flood control, drinking water and recreation. It is owned by the Corps of Engineers. Heyburn State Park (Oklahoma) adjoins the lake.

Description

The lake capacity is 55,030 acre feet; the conservation storage provides 3,800 acre-feet of storage which includes 1,900 acre-feet for water supply and 1,900 acre-feet for sediment reserve. The flood storage portion of the lake has 48,410 acre-feet reserved to store flood waters.

Recreation facilities
Recreational facilities include boating, water skiing, swimming and fishing. Three areas offer campgrounds: Sunset Bay (tent sites), Sheppard Point (tent and RV sites) and Heyburn Park (RV sites). They all have picnic areas, restrooms, showers, playgrounds and boat launches.

The Heyburn Public Hunting Area is a  tract that allows hunting quail, squirrel, rabbit, waterfowl and wild turkey.

Heyburn, Oklahoma
The hamlet known as Heyburn, Oklahoma, was built along the Frisco railroad during the 1880s. It was named for a local resident, Clay Heyburn. By 1920, there were 35 residents, a railroad station, a post office, two general stores and a cotton gin. The post office opened December 11, 1911 and closed October 14, 1922. When U, S. Route 66 was built a half mile north of the community, one of the general stores moved to the highway. The rest of the hamlet was soon abandoned and the structures vanished. The store on the highway has changed owners and locations several times, but is still known as the Heyburn store.

References

Reservoirs in Oklahoma
Protected areas of Creek County, Oklahoma
Ghost towns in Oklahoma
Geography of Creek County, Oklahoma
Dams in Oklahoma
United States Army Corps of Engineers dams
Dams completed in 1950
Bodies of water of Creek County, Oklahoma